Blood Red is a 1989 Western film directed by Peter Masterson and starring Eric Roberts, Giancarlo Giannini, Burt Young, Lara Harris, and Dennis Hopper. It was filmed and completed in 1986, but released three years later.

Synopsis 

Set in the 1890s, the story centers around the life of a Sicilian family, the Collogeros, living in California and working in the winemaking business, and their confrontation with a powerful railroad and land baron named William Bradford Berrigan (Hopper), who is after their lands and the ones that belong to the other families in the area. Berrigan's plan is to get control of the properties in order to build a new railroad. When the conflict escalates, he murders the patriarch of the family, Sebastian Collogero (Giannini), and in response, his son Marco (Roberts) claims for justice. With the help of his family and others, Marco starts an open guerrilla war against Berrigan.

Cast 
 Eric Roberts as Marco Collogero
 Giancarlo Giannini as Sebastian Collogero
 Dennis Hopper as William Bradford Berrigan
 Burt Young as Andrews
 Carlin Glynn as Miss Jeffreys
 Lara Harris as Angelica
 Joseph Runningfox as Samuel Joseph
 Al Ruscio as Antonio Segestra
 Michael Madsen as Enzio
 Elias Koteas as Silvio
 Francesca De Sapio as Rosa Collogero
 Marc Lawrence as Michael Fazio
 Frank Campanella as Dr. Scola
 Aldo Ray as Father Stassio
 Gary Swanson as Senator Willard Endicott
 Susan Anspach as Widow
 Kevin Cooney as Major Riggs
 Julia Roberts as Maria Collogero
 Charles Dierkop as Cooper

References

External links 
 
 
 

1989 films
1989 Western (genre) films
American Western (genre) films
Films directed by Peter Masterson
1980s English-language films
1980s American films